Montarrón is a municipality of Spain located in the province of Guadalajara, Castile-La Mancha. As of 2004, it has a registered population of 44 (INE).

See also 
 List of municipalities in Guadalajara

References

Municipalities in the Province of Guadalajara